Peanut butter is a food paste or spread made from ground, dry-roasted peanuts. It commonly contains additional ingredients that modify the taste or texture, such as salt, sweeteners, or emulsifiers. Consumed in many countries, it is the most commonly used of the nut butters, a group that also includes cashew butter and almond butter (though peanuts are not nuts, peanut butter is culinarily considered a nut butter).

Peanut butter is a nutrient-rich food containing high levels of protein, several vitamins, and dietary minerals. It is typically served as a spread on bread, toast, or crackers, and used to make sandwiches (notably the peanut butter and jelly sandwich). It is also used in a number of breakfast dishes and desserts, such as granola, smoothies, crepes, cookies, brownies, or croissants.

History 

The earliest references to peanut butter can be traced to Aztec and Inca civilizations, who ground roasted peanuts into a paste. However, several people can be credited with the invention of modern peanut butter and the processes involved in making it.

The US National Peanut Board credits three modern inventors with the earliest patents related to the production of modern peanut butter. Marcellus Gilmore Edson of Montreal, Quebec, Canada, obtained the first patent for a method of producing peanut butter from roasted peanuts using heated surfaces in 1884. Edson's cooled product had "a consistency like that of butter, lard, or ointment" according to his patent application which described a process of milling roasted peanuts until the peanuts reached "a fluid or semi-fluid state". He mixed sugar into the paste to harden its consistency.

A businessman from St. Louis named George Bayle produced and sold peanut butter in the form of a snack food in 1894. By 1917, American consumers used peanut products during periods of meat rationing, with government promotions of "meatless Mondays" when peanut butter was a favored choice. 

John Harvey Kellogg, known for his line of prepared breakfast cereals, was an advocate of using plant foods as a healthier dietary choice than meat. He was issued a patent for a "Process of Producing Alimentary Products" in 1898, and used peanuts, although he boiled the peanuts rather than roasting them. Kellogg's Western Health Reform Institute served peanut butter to patients because they needed a food that contained a lot of protein that could be eaten without chewing.  At first, peanut butter was a food for wealthy people, as it became popular initially as a product served at expensive health care institutes.

Although often credited with its invention, George Washington Carver did not invent peanut butter. By the time Carver published his document about peanuts, entitled "How to Grow the Peanut and 105 Ways of Preparing it For Human Consumption" in 1916, many methods of preparation of peanut butter had already been developed or patented by various pharmacists, doctors, and food scientists working in the US and Canada.

Early peanut-butter-making machines were developed by Joseph Lambert, who had worked at John Harvey Kellogg's Battle Creek Sanatorium, and Dr. Ambrose Straub who obtained a patent for a peanut-butter-making machine in 1903. 

"In 1922, chemist Joseph Rosefield invented a process for making smooth peanut butter that kept the oil from separating by using partially hydrogenated oil; Rosefield "...licensed his invention to the company that created Peter Pan peanut butter" in 1928; further, in "...1932 he began producing his own peanut butter under the name Skippy". Under the Skippy brand, Rosefield developed a new method of churning creamy peanut butter, giving it a smoother consistency. He also mixed fragments of peanut into peanut butter, creating the first "chunky"-style peanut butter. In 1955, Procter & Gamble launched a peanut butter named Jif, which was sweeter than other brands, due to the use of "sugar and molasses" in its recipe. A slang term for peanut butter in World War II was "monkey butter".

In South Africa, the first peanut butter was produced in 1926 by Alderton Limited in Mokopane (then called Potgietersrus), presumably under the brand name Black Cat. The product proved so popular that Tiger Brands (then Tiger Oats Company) took over the manufacture of Black Cat. The company still produces peanut butter under the brand name Black Cat. In Afrikaans,  (peanut butter) is also colloquially called  (kitten butter); it is undetermined if Black Cat is the basis for this name.

A related dish named pinda-käse (peanut cheese) existed in Suriname by 1783. This was more solid than modern peanut butter, and could be cut and served in slices like cheese. Pinda bravoe, a soup-like peanut based dish, also existed in Suriname around that time. Modern peanut butter is still referred to as "pindakaas" (peanut cheese) in Dutch for this reason, Suriname having been a Dutch colony at that time. When peanut butter was brought onto the market in the Netherlands by Calvé in 1948, it was not allowed to do so under the name "peanut butter". The word "butter" was specifically reserved for real butter, to avoid confusion with margarine.

Types 
Among the types of peanut butter are:
 conventional peanut butter, which consists of up to 10% salt, sugars, and hydrogenated vegetable oil
 crunchy or chunky peanut butter, which includes coarsely-ground peanut fragments to give extra texture
 smooth peanut butter, in which the peanuts are ground uniformly, possibly with the addition of corn syrup and vegetable oil, to create a thick, creamy texture like butter
 natural peanut butter, which normally contains only peanuts and salt and is sold without emulsifiers that bind the peanut oils with the peanut paste, and so requires stirring to recombine the ingredients before consumption
 organic and artisanal peanut butters, whose markets are small; artisanal peanut butter is usually preservative-free, additive-free, and handmade in a cottage industry-style setup used first around 1970.

Production process

Planting and harvesting 

Due to weather conditions, peanuts are usually planted in spring. The peanut comes from a yellow flower that bends over and penetrates the soil after blooming and wilting, and the peanut starts to grow in the soil. Peanuts are harvested from late August to October, while the weather is clear. This weather allows for dry soil so that when picked, the soil does not stick to the stems and pods. The peanuts are then removed from vines and transported to a peanut shelling machine for mechanical drying. After cropping, the peanuts are delivered to warehouses for cleaning, where they are stored unshelled in silos.

Shelling 
Shelling must be conducted carefully lest the seeds be damaged during the removal of the shell. The moisture of the unshelled peanuts is controlled to avoid excessive frangibility of the shells and kernels, which in turn, reduces the amount of dust present in the plant. After, the peanuts are sent to a series of rollers set specifically for the batch of peanuts, where they are cracked. After cracking, the peanuts go through a screening process where they are inspected for contaminants.

Roasting 
The dry roasting process employs either the batch or continuous method. This method is good to use when the peanuts differ in moisture content. In the continuous method, a hot air roaster is employed. The peanuts pass through the roaster whilst being rocked to permit even roasting. A photometer indicates the completion of dry roasting. This method is favored by large manufacturers since it can lower the rate of spoilage and requires less labor.

Cooling 
After dry roasting, peanuts are removed from the oven as quickly as possible and directly placed in a blower-cooler cylinder. There are suction fans in the metal cylinder that can pull a large volume of air through, so the peanuts can be cooled more efficiently. The peanuts will not be dried out because cooling can help retain some oil and moisture. The cooling process is completed when the temperature in the cylinder reaches .

Blanching 
After the kernels have been cooled down, the peanuts will undergo either heat blanching or water blanching to remove the remaining seed coats. Compared to heat blanching, water blanching is a new process. Water blanching first appeared in 1949.

Heat blanching 
After that, the peanuts are exposed to continuous steam in a blanching machine. The skins are then removed using either bristles or soft rubber belts. After that, these skins are separated and blown into waste bags. Meanwhile, the hearts of peanuts are segregated through inspection.

Water blanching 
After the kernels are arranged in troughs, the skin of the kernel is cracked on opposite sides by rolling it through sharp stationary blades. While the skins are removed, the kernels are brought through a one-minute hot water bath and placed on a swinging pad with canvas on top. The swinging action of the pad rubs off the skins.

After blanching, the peanuts are screened and inspected to eliminate the burnt and rotten peanuts. A blower is also used to remove light peanuts and discolored peanuts are removed using a color sorting machine.

Grinding 
After blanching the peanuts are sent to grinding to be manufactured into peanut butter.  The peanuts are then sent through two sizes of grinders. The first grinder produces a medium grind, and the second produces a fine grind. At this point, salt, sugar and a vegetable oil stabilizer may be added to the fine grind; this adds flavor and allows the peanut butter to stay as a homogeneous mixture. Chopped peanuts may also be added at this stage to produce "chunky" peanut butter.

Packaging 
Before packaging, the peanut butter must first be cooled in order to be sealed in jars. Once cool, the peanut butter is pumped into jars and vacuum-sealed, a process which removes air and deoxygenates the peanut butter to inhibit its oxidation. The jars are then labeled and set aside until crystallization occurs. The peanut butter jars are then packaged into cartons distributed to retailers, where they are stored at room temperature and sold to consumers.

A 2012 article stated that "China and India are the first and second-largest producers, respectively", of peanuts. The United States of America "...is the third-largest producer of peanuts (Georgia and Texas are the two major peanut-producing states)" and "more than half of the American peanut crop goes into making peanut butter."

Consumption 
The United States is a leading exporter of peanut butter, and one of the largest consumers of peanut butter annually per capita. January 24 is National Peanut Butter Day in the United States. In March 2020 during the COVID-19 pandemic, retail sales of peanut butter in the United States increased by 75% over the level in March 2019.

According to Jon Krampner's 2013 book on peanut butter, per capita consumption of peanut butter in Canada and the Netherlands  the largest consumer per capita in Europe  exceed that in the United States.

In Israel, the peanut-butter-flavored puffcorn snack Bamba accounts for 25% of the snack market; its consumption by infants has been linked to a low incidence of peanut allergies among Israelis.

Health

Nutritional profile 

In a 100 gram amount, smooth peanut butter supplies 597 Calories and is composed of 51% fat, 22% protein, 22% carbohydrates (including 5% dietary fiber), and 1% water (table). Both crunchy and smooth peanut butter are sources of saturated and monounsaturated fats (mainly oleic acid) as 25% of total serving amount, and polyunsaturated fat (12% of total), primarily as linoleic acid).

Peanut butter is a rich source (20% or more of the Daily Value, DV) of dietary fiber, vitamin E, pantothenic acid, folate, niacin, and vitamin B6 (table, USDA FoodData Central). Also high in content are the dietary minerals manganese, magnesium, phosphorus, zinc, copper, and sodium (added as salt during manufacturing). Peanut butter is a moderate source (10–19% DV) of thiamin, riboflavin, iron, and potassium (table).

Peanut allergy 
For people with a peanut allergy, peanut butter can cause a variety of possible allergic reactions, including life-threatening anaphylaxis.  This potential effect has led to banning peanut butter, among other common foods, in some schools.

Symptoms
 Shortness of breath
 Wheezing
 Tightening of the throat
 Itching 
 Skin reactions such as hives and swelling
 Digestive problems

Uses

As an ingredient 
Peanut butter is included as an ingredient in many recipes: peanut butter and jelly sandwiches, peanut butter cookies, and candies where peanut is the main flavor, such as Reese's Pieces, or various peanut butter and chocolate treats, such as Reese's Peanut Butter Cups and the Crispy Crunch candy bar.

Peanut butter's flavor combines well with other flavors, such as oatmeal, cheese, cured meats, savory sauces, and various types of breads and crackers.  The creamy or crunchy, fatty, salty taste pairs very well with complementary soft and sweet ingredients like fruit preserves, bananas, apples, and honey. The taste can also be enhanced by similarly salty things like bacon (see Peanut butter, banana and bacon sandwich), especially if the peanut butter has added sweetness.

One snack for children is called "ants on a log", with a celery stick acting as the "log". The groove in the celery stick is filled with peanut butter and raisins arranged in a row along the top are "ants".

Plumpy'nut is a peanut butter-based food used to fight malnutrition in famine-stricken countries. A single pack contains 500 calories, can be stored unrefrigerated for two years, and requires no cooking or preparation.

As animal food 
Peanut butter inside a hollow chew toy is a method to occupy a dog with a favored treat. A common outdoor bird feeder is a coating of peanut butter on a pine cone with an overlying layer of birdseed.

See also 

 List of peanut dishes – includes dishes that use peanut butter as a main ingredient
 List of spreads
 Peanut paste
 Peanut pie
 Peanut sauce
 Ruth Desmond, "Peanut Butter Grandmother"

References

Further reading
Creamy and Crunchy: An Informal History of Peanut Butter, the All-American Food by Jon Krampner, published by Columbia University Press (2014),

External links

 US Code of Federal Regulations, Peanut butter; part 164.150; last amended 24 March 1998 

 
American cuisine
Canadian cuisine
Canadian inventions
Food ingredients
Nut and seed butters